Witness for the Prosecution is a 1982 American made-for-television drama film version of Agatha Christie's 1925 short story and 1953 play, and also a remake of the Billy Wilder film Witness for the Prosecution (1957).

Plot summary
Sir Wilfred Robarts, a famed barrister, has just been released from the hospital in which he stayed for two months following a heart attack. Returning to his practise of law, he takes the case of Leonard Vole, an unemployed man who is accused of murdering the elderly Emily French, who had bequeathed her estate to him. Vole claims he's innocent, although all evidence points to him as the killer, but his alibi witness, his cold German wife Christine, instead of entering the court as a witness for the defense, becomes the witness for the prosecution and defiantly testifies that her husband is guilty of the murder. Sir Wilfred represents Vole but retains his suspicions regarding the accused man's icy wife.

Cast
 Sir Ralph Richardson as Sir Wilfred Robarts QC
 Deborah Kerr as Miss Plimsoll, Sir Wilfred's nurse
 Diana Rigg as Christine Heilger/Vole
 Beau Bridges as Leonard Vole
 Donald Pleasence as Myers QC, the prosecutor
 Dame Wendy Hiller as Janet Mackenzie, Emily French's maid
 David Langton as Mayhew, Vole's solicitor
 Richard Vernon as Brogan-Moore, Sir Wilfred's colleague
 Peter Sallis as the butler, Carter
 Michael Gough as the Judge
 Frank Mills as Chief Inspector Hearne
 Primi Townsend as Diana
 Patricia Leslie as Emily French (seen in flashbacks)

Production
The film was directed by Alan Gibson, based on a teleplay by John Gay and the adaptation of Larry Marcus. The musical score was composed by John Cameron.

The cast includes many veteran and well-known actors such as Sir Ralph Richardson, Deborah Kerr, Diana Rigg, Donald Pleasence, Dame Wendy Hiller, Peter Sallis and Beau Bridges. Unlike the original Billy Wilder film, the TV version stays more faithful to the Christie's original short story, including the scene where Sir Wilfred meets the scarred Cockney woman in an apartment in a sleazy district of London (instead of at the railway station as in the Wilder version).

This version, also, instead of opening with Sir Wilfrid (renamed "Sir Wilfred") returning home, features an opening prologue where Janet Mackenzie returns to her employer's house, where she sees Mrs. French laughing and drinking with someone, goes upstairs and takes a pattern from her room, and hears noise from downstairs, and discovers in shock the body of Mrs. French.

This was Sir Ralph Richardson's last appearance in films made for television, while it also was Kerr's  U.S. television debut.  Alan Gibson, the director of this film, also directed The Satanic Rites of Dracula, in which Richard Vernon, who plays the part of Brogan-Moore in Witness for the Prosecution, had a small role.

John Gay, the writer of the teleplay, also wrote teleplays for the Lux Video Theatre, a television anthology series. Lux Video Theatre also produced an adaptation of Witness for the Prosecution, in 1953 (four years before the Wilder version).

Reception

Critical
The New York Times called it "a great deal of fun", praising the "remarkable durability" of Christie's original material, and the performances of Richardson and Rigg.

Awards
Arthur Ibbetson was nominated for an Emmy Award for outstanding cinematography for his work on the production.

References

External links
 "Witness for the Prosecution" on IMDb
 "Witness for the Prosecution" on MTEDb
 Review at All Movie Guide

1982 television films
1982 films
American courtroom films
Films about lawyers
Films based on works by Agatha Christie
Films directed by Alan Gibson
Films scored by John Cameron
Films with screenplays by John Gay (screenwriter)
Hallmark Hall of Fame episodes
Television remakes of films
1980s American films